Scherwiller is a commune in the Bas-Rhin department in Alsace in northeastern France. Residents are referred to as Scherwillerois in French.

Geography

History
The name was mentioned early in the form Sceravillare or Scerwiller, designating a hamlet on the edge of the Scheer, the former name of the Aubach River, which runs through the village. Scherwiller is located at the intersection of two Roman roads: on an east–west axis the salt road from the Villé Valley, and on a north–south axis a Roman road, two milestones of which are still identifiable in the town itself. This explains the presence of Ortenbourg Castle during the 12th century.

Economy
Located in the heart of Alsace, the village is built in the middle of a  vineyard, extending along the slopes downwards from Ortenbourg and Ramstein castles.

See also
 Communes of the Bas-Rhin department

References

Communes of Bas-Rhin
Bas-Rhin communes articles needing translation from French Wikipedia